Kampong Tiong Bahru is a subzone within the planning area of Bukit Merah, Singapore, as defined by the Urban Redevelopment Authority (URA). Its boundary is made up of the Ayer Rajah Expressway (AYE) in the south; Kampong Bahru Road in the east; Jalan Bukit Merah in the north; and Lower Delta Road in the west.

References

Bukit Merah
Central Region, Singapore